Euphorbia tuckeyana is a species of flowering plants of the family Euphorbiaceae. The species is endemic to Cape Verde. The species is named after James Hingston Tuckey. Its local name is tortolho. The plants are used for tanning hides. As most other succulent members of the genus Euphorbia, its trade is regulated under Appendix II of CITES.

Description

Euphorbia tuckeyana is a shrub that can reach 3 m height. It has milky sap. Its elliptical leaves are placed in rosettes. It has yellow flowers.

Distribution and ecology
Euphorbia tuckeyana occurs on most of the Cape Verde islands, but not on Maio. It grows in semi-arid, sub-humid and humid zones, between 100 and 2,500 metres elevation. The plants grow in rocky places and escarpments. It is characteristic of the endemic vegetation of the Cape Verde Islands.

References

Further reading
 ''The endemic vascular plants of the Cape Verde Islands, W Africa, Sommerfeltia 24, 1997,  C. Brochmann, Ø. H. Rustan, W. Lobin & N. Kilian, ISSN 0800-6865,  

tuckeyana
Endemic flora of Cape Verde